The RC44 sailboat was designed by Russell Coutts and with the assistance of naval architect Andrej Justin the boat is built by Pauger Carbon Composite / Pauger Yachts and first launched in 2007. The class is recognised by the International Sailing Federation in November 2009 and held it first World Championships in 2010.

History
The boat was conceived in 2007.

Events

World Championships

World Tour
In addition the class holds a tour taking in a number of the key sailing locations in North America, Europe and the Middle East.

References

External links
Official RC44 Class Association Website
Boat designer Official Website
 Builders Official Website
  ISAF RC44 Microsite Website
  ISAF Homepage

 
Classes of World Sailing
Sailing yachts
2000s sailboat type designs